The Circus Burned Down, and the Clowns Have Gone ( Tsirk sgorel, i klouny razbezhalis) is a 1998 Russian drama film directed by Vladimir Bortko and starring Nikolai Karachentsov. It tells the story of a successful film director who is about to turn 50 and struggles with financiers, his insane mother and a mysterious woman who tells him how meaningless his life is.

Cast
 Nikolai Karachentsov as Nikolai Khudokormov
 Tanya Yu as Stranger
 Zinaida Sharko as Nikolai's Mother
 Nina Ruslanova as Toma
 Maria Shukshina as Lena
 Tatyana Vasilyeva as Margarita
 Kseniya Kachalina as Alya
 Sergey Dreyden as Aleksei
 Pyotr Zaychenko as Igor
 Rudolf Furmanov as Artyom
 Yury  Kuznetsov as cossack

Accolades
Zinaida Sharko won the Best Actress award at the 1998 Open Russian Film Festival in Sochi. Vladimir Dashkevich was nominated for the Nika Award for Best Music.

References

External links 
 

1998 drama films
1998 films
Films about film directors and producers
Films about clowns
Films directed by Vladimir Bortko
Russian drama films
1990s Russian-language films